NJCAA Men's Division I Basketball Championships is held annually in March at the Hutchinson Sports Arena in Hutchinson, KS. The first official NJCAA National Championship was in 1948 in Springfield, MO at the Southwest State College Fieldhouse. The event moved to "Hutch" in 1949, and has been there ever since. The format has changed many times throughout its history, and until 2013 it was a false double-elimination tournament. Now the event is single elimination and consists of 23 games over six days. The NJCAA had only one division for Men's Basketball until the 1986–87 season when Division 2 was added. A third non-scholarship division was formed starting with the 1990 tournament. The NJCAA is divided into 24 Regions who form 16 Districts. The 16 District Champions receive automatic berths in the National Championship, and there are eight at-large bids extended. This format has been in effect since the 2017 Championship. The results below are for Division 1 only.

List of Division 1 NJCAA Schools

Championship Leaders

See also
NJCAA Men's Division II Basketball Championship
NJCAA Men's Division III Basketball Championship
NJCAA Women's Basketball Championship

External links 
NJCAA DI tournament page

Basketball, Men's Division I